The Aldabra white-eye (Zosterops aldabrensis) is a bird species in the family Zosteropidae. It is endemic to the island of Aldabra in the Indian Ocean.

The Aldabra white-eye was formerly treated as a subspecies of the Malagasy white-eye (Zosterops maderaspatanus) but based on the results of a molecular phylogenetic study published in 2014, it is now treated as a separate species.

References

Aldabra white-eye
Birds of Seychelles
Aldabra white-eye
Taxa named by Robert Ridgway